Emily M. Brewer (born May 27, 1984) is an American small business owner and member of the Virginia House of Delegates representing the 64th District.

District overview

The district includes Isle of Wight County, Virginia, Prince George County, Virginia, Surry County, Virginia, and Suffolk, Virginia (part).

Electoral history
She was elected in 2017 after the incumbent, Republican Delegate Rick Morris, opted not to run for reelection.

In a June 2017 Republican Primary Brewer defeated her primary opponent, Rex W. Alphin, by a margin of 61% to 39%.

In the November General Election, Brewer defeated the Democratic candidate, Rebecca S. Colaw, garnering over 62% of the vote.

Political career 
Delegate Brewer was sworn in on January 10, 2018. At the age of 33, Brewer became the youngest female member ever of the Republican caucus in the House of Delegates.

Delegate Brewer has received numerous awards and recognitions for her hard work in Richmond on behalf of her constituents. Brewer received the 2018 Freshman Legislator of the Year Award by the Virginia Chamber of Commerce and was nominated and selected as one of the 27 legislators nationwide to be honored as one of GOPAC's Emerging Leaders. She also received national recognition as one of MAVPAC's Future 40. Having been adopted as a young child, Delegate Brewer is an advocate for adoption and pro-life policies.

In 2022, Brewer was promoted to chair of the Communications, Technology and Innovation Committee.

In January 2022, Brewer announced that she would be running for the State Senate's newly established 17th District, which includes much of her House district. Brewer will be running against former NASCAR driver Hermie Sadler for the Republican nomination.

Personal life 
Brewer resides in Isle of Wight County with her husband, Andrew. In November 2022, she gave birth to her first child, a daughter named Presley.

References

1984 births
Living people
People from Wyandot County, Ohio
Politicians from Suffolk, Virginia
Women state legislators in Virginia
Republican Party members of the Virginia House of Delegates
21st-century American politicians
21st-century American women politicians